This page includes Betty Compson's (March 19, 1897 – April 18, 1974) known film appearances from 1915–48. 

Films from 1915 to 1919 are shorts, mostly for Al Christie, unless otherwise stated. A big breakout came in 1919, with The Miracle Man, which is now lost. In the early-to-mid 1920s, Compson was a major player at Paramount. By the end of the decade, her work became free-lance. Her fame began to decline after marrying director James Cruze, and she would remain a feature support for the rest of her film career.

Shorts

Features

Silent Films: 1918–1929

Sound Films: 1928–1931

Films 1932–1948

External links
Betty Compson at IMDb.com

Compson, Betty
American filmographies